Worlds of Wonder is an amusement and water park located in Sector-38A, Noida, Gautam Buddha Nagar District, Uttar Pradesh, nearby to Delhi, India. The park is owned and operated by Entertainment City Limited, a joint venture of International Amusement Limited and Unitech Holdings Ltd.

The park opened in mid 2007 and includes over 20 rides, a water park and a go-kart.

Park ride details

 Amusement Park (Teen Zone): Operational since Sept, 2007
 Amusement Park (Family & Children's Zone): Operational since Dec, 2008
 Arrival Village: Operational Since Dec, 2009
 WOW Lake: Operational since Aug, 2012
 Water Park: Operational since Aug, 2013 
 Go Karting: Operational since Jan, 2014

References

Amusement parks in India
Noida
2007 establishments in Uttar Pradesh
Buildings and structures in Noida
Tourist attractions in Gautam Buddh Nagar district
Water parks in India
Amusement parks opened in 2007